Oron Castle is a castle in the municipality of Oron in the canton of Vaud in Switzerland. It is a Swiss heritage site of national significance.

History
The castle was built in the 13th century. It was totally rebuilt in second half of the 15th century and renovated several times in the 17th century. In 1801 it was acquired the Roberti family of Moudon, and in 1870 it was bought by Adolphe Gaiffe. Beginning in 1880, a library was built in the castle. Today it houses 17,000 volumes and is one of the largest private collections of French novelists of the 18th century in Europe. The castle was bought in 1936 by the Association pour la Conservation du château d'Oron, which was founded to preserve the castle two years earlier.

See also
 List of castles in Switzerland
 Château
 House of Oron

References

External links

Castle of Oron at Swisscastles.ch

Castles in Vaud
Cultural property of national significance in the canton of Vaud